{{DISPLAYTITLE:IC50}}

The half maximal inhibitory concentration (IC50) is a measure of the potency of a substance in inhibiting a specific biological or biochemical function. IC50 is a quantitative measure that indicates how much of a particular inhibitory substance (e.g. drug) is needed to inhibit, in vitro, a given biological process or biological component by 50%. The biological component could be an enzyme, cell, cell receptor or microorganism. IC50 values are typically expressed as molar concentration.

IC50 is commonly used as a measure of antagonist drug potency in pharmacological research. IC50 is comparable to other measures of potency, such as EC50 for excitatory drugs. EC50 represents the dose or plasma concentration required for obtaining 50% of a maximum effect in vivo.

IC50 can be determined with functional assays or with competition binding assays.

Sometimes, IC50 values are converted to the pIC50 scale.

Due to the minus sign, higher values of pIC50 indicate exponentially more potent inhibitors. pIC50 is usually given in terms of molar concentration (mol/L, or M), thus requiring IC50 in units of M.

The IC50 terminology is also used for some behavioral measures in vivo, such as a two bottle fluid consumption test. When animals decrease consumption from the drug-laced water bottle, the concentration of the drug that results in a 50% decrease in consumption is considered the IC50 for fluid consumption of that drug.

Functional antagonist assay
The IC50 of a drug can be determined by constructing a dose-response curve and examining the effect of different concentrations of antagonist on reversing agonist activity. IC50 values can be calculated for a given antagonist by determining the concentration needed to inhibit half of the maximum biological response of the agonist. IC50 values can be used to compare the potency of two antagonists.

IC50 values are very dependent on conditions under which they are measured. In general, a higher concentration of inhibitor leads to lowered agonist activity. IC50 value increases as agonist concentration increases. Furthermore, depending on the type of inhibition, other factors may influence IC50 value; for ATP dependent enzymes, IC50 value has an interdependency with concentration of ATP, especially if inhibition is competitive.

IC50 and affinity

Competition binding assays
In this type of assay, a single concentration of radioligand (usually an agonist) is used in every assay tube. The ligand is used at a low concentration, usually at or below its Kd value. The level of specific binding of the radioligand is then determined in the presence of a range of concentrations of other competing non-radioactive compounds (usually antagonists), in order to measure the potency with which they compete for the binding of the radioligand. Competition curves may also be computer-fitted to a logistic function as described under direct fit.

In this situation the IC50 is the concentration of competing ligand which displaces 50% of the specific binding of the radioligand. The IC50 value is converted to an absolute inhibition constant Ki using the Cheng-Prusoff equation formulated by Yung-Chi Cheng and William Prusoff (see Ki).

Cheng Prusoff equation 
IC50 is not a direct indicator of affinity, although the two can be related at least for competitive agonists and antagonists by the Cheng-Prusoff equation. For enzymatic reactions, this equation is:

where Ki is the binding affinity of the inhibitor, IC50 is the functional strength of the inhibitor, [S] is fixed substrate concentration and Km is the Michaelis constant i.e. concentration of substrate at which enzyme activity is at half maximal (but is frequently confused with substrate affinity for the enzyme, which it is not).

Alternatively, for inhibition constants at cellular receptors:

where [A] is the fixed concentration of agonist and EC50 is the concentration of agonist that results in half maximal activation of the receptor. Whereas the IC50 value for a compound may vary between experiments depending on experimental conditions, (e.g. substrate and enzyme concentrations) the Ki is an absolute value. Ki is the inhibition constant for a drug; the concentration of competing ligand in a competition assay which would occupy 50% of the receptors if no ligand were present.

The Cheng-Prusoff equation produces good estimates at high agonist concentrations, but over- or under-estimates Ki at low agonist concentrations. In these conditions, other analyses have been recommended.

See also 
 Certain safety factor
 EC50 (half maximal effective concentration)
 LD50 (median lethal dose)
 Ki (equilibrium constant)

References

External links 
 AAT Bioquest Online IC50 Calculator
 Online IC50 calculator (www.ic50.tk) based on the C programming language and gnuplot
 Alternative online IC50 calculator (www.ic50.org) based on Python, NumPy, SciPy and Matplotlib 
 ELISA IC50/EC50 Online Tool (link seems broken)
 IC50 to pIC50 calculator
 Online tool for analysis of in vitro resistance to antimalarial drugs
 IC50-to-Ki converter of an inhibitor and enzyme that obey classic Michaelis-Menten kinetics.

Concentration indicators
Pharmacodynamics